Collection of Splits 2002–2004 is a compilation album by Canadian grindcore band Fuck the Facts. It was released in the spring of 2006 on Great White North Records.

The compilation contains all of the tracks (minus live and bonus tracks) from the splits released between Backstabber Etiquette and Legacy of Hopelessness. It was also packed with enhanced MP3 tracks from some of the earlier splits and other oddities. Topon Das had expressed an interest in releasing a compilation after he realized that many fans were unable to acquire the actual splits, due to their limited pressings and many of the labels being overseas. This compilation made the band's material from these splits more accessible.

Track listing

Personnel
 Topon Das – guitar, bass, keyboards, samples, recording, mixing, mastering
 Mel Mongeon – vocals, artwork
 Matt Connell – drums, recording, mixing, mastering
 Jean-Philippe Latour – remastering

Additional Musicians
 Dave Menard – guitar on "Secret Asian," "Another Living Night" and "No One Remembered Who Started"
 Tim Audette – guitar on "Confession," "Empty Words" and "What I Am"
 Mike Alexander (Head Hits Concrete, Putrescence) – vocals on "Another Living Night"
 Wiande (Sergent Slaughter) – vocals on "This Means Nothing"
 Swiz (Electrocutionerdz) – samples on "Unburden" and "Ventriloquist Complex"

Release
Due to the limited availability of many of their splits, Fuck the Facts decided to release this compilation in the hopes that fans could get their music more readily. Shortly after the release of this album, Great White North Records folded. 500 copies were made, but it is suspected that many were lost while trying to get across the border for distribution. As a result, the initial intent to increase availability was unsuccessful. However, in July 2007, Galy Records re-released the collection, making it readily available again.

References

2006 compilation albums
Fuck the Facts albums